Wild Rose is the soundtrack to the 2018 British film of the same name, released by Island Records on 12 April 2019. 

The album features both original songs written exclusively for the film and covers of songs by established country artists such as Emmylou Harris, Wynonna Judd, Chris Stapleton, Hank Snow, and folk artists John Prine and Patty Griffin, as well as indie rock band Primal Scream. All songs are performed by singer Jessie Buckley, with the exception of tracks 17, 18, and 19 (which are performed by The Bluegrass Smugglers), and track 20 (which is performed by Hillary Klug). The album charted at No. 76 on the UK Albums Chart and at No. 1 on the UK Country Albums Chart.

Singles
"Country Girl" was released as the soundtrack's lead single on 22 February 2019. An accompanying music video, directed by Libby Burke Wilde, was released on 1 March 2019. Two more singles followed, "Born to Run" and "Glasgow (No Place Like Home)".

Track listing

References

2019 soundtrack albums
Island Records soundtracks
Drama film soundtracks